The Walchensee-class tanker (Type 703) is a series of four small coastal tankers, built by Lindenau-Werft in Kiel for the German Navy to transport fuel and fresh water between depots and to units near coasts or in harbour.

Two ships were in service until December 2015 and are disposed off, the other 2 were already decommissioned (one sold & one scrapped).

Ship list

See also

 T1 tanker US coastal tanker
 T2 tanker 
 T3 Tanker 
 Victory ships
 Liberty ship
 Type C1 ship
 Type C2 ship
 Type C3 ship
United States Navy oiler

References
 Betriebsstofftransporter WALCHENSEE-Klasse (703) (German) - Marine (official homepage of the German Navy)

Further reading 
 Gerhard Koop/Siegfried Breyer: Die Schiffe, Fahrzeuge und Flugzeuge der deutschen Marine von 1956 bis heute, Bernard & Graefe Verlag, Bonn 1996,  (German)

Auxiliary transport ship classes
Tankers of Germany
Auxiliary ships of Germany
Auxiliary ships of the German Navy